Mariana Ximenes do Prado Nuzzi (born 26 April 1981) is a Brazilian actress. Her first role was in the telenovela Fascinação in 1998 where she portrayed the role of Emília Gouveia. In the same year she played the role of Ruth Stern in the film Caminho dos Sonhos. In 2000, she played in Uga-Uga portraying "Bionda". This role rise to prominence as she became widely known in Brazil and internationally. Later in 2001, she offered her services in the Portuguese voice over translation in the Canadian/Chinese animated series Braceface, for the character Sharon Spitz. She later played the protagonist in Cobras & Lagartos in 2006 and Lara in A Favorita, later in 2008. In 2010, she portrayed her first villainous role in the critically acclaimed telenovela Passione. Since 2010 she has appeared in several telenovelas, television series, films and theatre performances. In 2016, she starred the successor of Totalmente Demais, Haja Coração, together with Malvino Salvador.

Mariana Ximenes has also earned several accolades throughout her acting career such as: Melhores do Ano, Troféu Impresa, Festival de Gramado, Festival do Recife, Prêmio Contigo among others.

Biography: early life 
Mariana Ximenes do Prado Nuzzi was born in São Paulo on 26 April 1981 and grew up in Vila Mariana, a neighborhood in São Paulo.

Mariana dreamed to be an actress since her childhood. At age 6, she appeared in a school play as Cinderella.  She began acting in amateur theater, insisting to her parents invest in her career as an actress, even participating in various advertising campaigns. Her first acting lessons were in Teatro Escola Célia Helena, and at age 12, she had already appeared in more than 200 commercials. She attended Colégio Marista Arquidiocesano, where she studied from 3rd grade till her 3rd year of high school.

Career

1994–01: Fascinação, Uga-Uga and A Padroeira 
When she was thirteen, in 1994, Mariana debuted on television in the telenovela 74.5 - Uma Onda no Ar in Rede Manchete making a cameo appearance to the latter. Shortly afterwards, she was invited to join the cast of  Fascinação of SBT in 1998, where she played the character Emília, her first major television role.  In the same year, she joined Rede Globo and began working in her (Rede Globo) productions. She appeared in the episode "Dupla Traição" in the series Você Decide and in the film Caminho dos Sonhos portraying the character Ruth Stern. She also participated in the pilot of the series Sandy & Junior portraying the character Vicky.

In 1999, she played Celi Montana in Andando nas Nuvens. She also made a cameo appearance in the telenovela Força de um Desejo playing Ângela, in 2000.

Mariana played the character Bionda, which yielded great success for her career. She later starred in the film Xuxa Popstar.

In 2001, she appeared in Brava Gente in the episode, "A Sonata", playing the character Luciana. She first performed in the Portuguese voice over translation for the character Sharon Spitz in the Canadian/Chinese animated series Braceface. She later did some ads for Fox Kids Brazil and she also played Izabel de Avelar in A Padroeira.  That same year, she also starred in her second film, Dias de Nietzsche em Turim, playing Júlia Fino.

2002–06: A Casa das Sete Mulheres, Chocolate com Pimenta and Cobras & Lagartos 

In 2002, Mariana Ximenes made a guest appearance in the comedy series Os Normais, in "A Turma do Didi" as Glorinha and Brava Gente in episode "Arioswaldo e o Lobisomem" as Branca Luz, alongside Suzana Vieira and Ângelo Antônio. Earlier that year, she had starred in her third film O Invasor, which earned her the award for Best Supporting Actress at the Festival do Recife,  Passista Trophy, Grande Prêmio BR do Cinema Brasileiro and Cinema Brazil Grand Prize.

The following year, she played the character Rosário in A Casa das Sete Mulheres. She won the award for Best romantic couple along with Thiago Fragoso earning her a Contigo Award for her character that became popular among viewers, although her character died at the end of the miniseries. During this period, Mariana made a special participation in the program Zorra Total and A Grande Família. Her next role was in a telenovela perhaps one of her most prominent in her entire career. She played Ana, the main protagonist, also known as Aninha, in Chocolate com Pimenta that earned her media attention due to its success thanks to her portrayal in the telenovela. Mariana also starred in films such as O Homem do Ano and Uma Estrela Pra Ioiô (2003). In 2004, she also participated in the special Histórias de Cama & Mesa.

In 2005, she was cast the critically acclaimed telenovela América as the rebellious Raíssa. Her role, was well received by critics: Sérgio Ripardo said that, "América would be remembered in the future because of Mariana Ximenes and Cléo Pires, due to the popularity of their characters" and Folha Online said, "The character Raíssa overshadowed the main character in the plot, Sol", played by Deborah Secco. This year, she also starred in one more film Gaijin - Ama-me Como Sou portraying Weronika Muller. She participated in her second Portuguese voice over translation in the movie Chicken Little, where he voiced the character Hebe Marreca, known as Pata Ugly. Also in 2005, she made a cameo in Casseta & Planeta playing the character Raíssa. In 2006, Mariana was cast as Lílian Gonçalves in the miniseries JK. In Cobras & Lagartos, she portrayed the character Bel, that was initially for Giovanna Antonelli. In the plot, her character is a violinist who inherits 49% of her deceased uncle, Omar (Francisco Cuoco), who owns a fictitious company called Luxus.

2007–10: A Favorita and Passione 
After Cobras & Lagartos, she made a cameo appearance in Paraíso Tropical as Sônia, a journalist who becomes the new girlfriend of the character Mateus, played by Gustavo Leão. Originally, Gilberto Braga had cast her to play the character Bebel, but she later turned down the offer thus Camila Pitanga taking over the role. The following year, Mariana played the heroine, Lara Fontini, in A Favorita, one of the main characters of the plot. The look of her character became a hit among Brazilians. She was invited to be the presenter of the program Superbonita channel GNT, where she spoke about pin-ups. She also made a cameo as herself in the documentary Episódio Especial and as herself in the documentary Despertar das Amazonas.

In 2010, Mariana Ximenes was cast to play Clara Medeiros in the telenovela Passione, her first villain role in her acting career. It is based on Bette Davis' characters. In order to compose the character as well as some other villains in Brazilian telenovelas, such as Nazaré of Renata Sorrah and Maria de Fátima of Glória Pires, some changes were also made on her visual appearance to liven the character, making her hair longer and dressing in bolder outfits.

The actress Mariana Ximenes topped the poll site in Caras magazine as the greatest villain in telenovela history. The critical Flávio Ricco said "Mariana Ximenes as Clara did one of her best work in television". She won in Troféu Imprensa Awards for Best Alctress for her portrayal of the character, and was also nominated in some other awards. The journalist Fabíola Reipert said, "Mariana Ximenes can show her talent, because she is in the main cast of the telenovela, even with only 29 years". The character Clara was also compared to Bia Falcão, Fernanda Montenegro's character in Belíssima.

Furthermore, Mariana returned to theater, starring in the play Os Altruístas, directed by Guilherme Weber, after nine years of not performing on stage.

2011–present: As Brasileiras, Guerra dos Sexos and movies 
In 2011, Due to the success of her character in Passione, Rede Globo decided to keep her away from the small screen for some time. She produced the film Um Homem Só by herself in addition to starring in the film. In May 2012, she was part of the cast of the series As Brasileiras in the episode "A Adormecida de Foz do Iguaçu", playing the seductive character Liliane. She made her comeback in the Portuguese voice over translation for 31 minutos, la película, for the voice of Cachirula's character. She was also confirmed to star in the Guerra dos Sexos as Juliana. Shortly afterwards she was part of the film Os Penetras with Eduardo Sterblitch and Marcelo Adnet. She also starred in the film O Gorila by the filmmaker José Eduardo Belmonte, as a seductive character.

In 2013, she starred in the movies O Uivo da Gaita and O Rio nos Pertence! by Ricardo Pretti. Mariana performed a vedette cabaret in Joia Rara. In 2015, she was auditioned for A Regra do Jogo but in March 2015, Rede Globo announced that Vanessa Giácomo was selected for the role.

Personal life

Relationships 

Mariana Ximenes and Pedro Buarque de Hollanda met at a party in 2001. They soon began cohabitating and  considered themselves a "married couple." They traveled together, and Mariana starred in a film produced by him, A Mulher do Meu Amigo.

The filmmaker was once kidnapped by two men who used knives to threaten him. He was released 18 hours after the payment of ransom of $100,000 was paid.

Soon after, confirmed her separation from Pedro. She stated that, "We parted cordially and maintain a friendship: alone and quiet".

Filmography

Television

Theater

Advertising

Risqué 
In 2008, Mariana Ximenes was invited to be the poster girl for Risqué business on the company's various glazes. Later that year, Risqué created a line of nail polishes called Rendas do Brasil, named after the traditional enamel leading the company's sales, Renda. The Risqué is the leader in selling nail polish, and the first to run commercials on TV about nail polishes. In 2009, she starred in Campaign Os 7 Vermelhos Capitais, with seven different shades of red, a special edition. In 2009, she was part of the campaign Risqué Jóias Místicas, with various shades, ranging from light to dark blue. According to the actress, the idea was genius, because she always combines her jewelry with the color of her nail polish. In 2011, she starred in the campaign Pop 4 You, a line of nail polishes inspired by the 60's, with colorful hues and typical summer colors. The line was launched in November, more glazes were used by Mariana in her character Clara in the propagated telenovela Passione. In 2012, she starred in the campaign Clássicos Risqué with shades of pink and her Frenchie, which was used in commercials and became a success.

Products and trade 
In 2000, investing in the success of the soap opera Uga-Uga, Rede Globo signed a contract with Estrela for manufacturing a Susi Bionda doll, inspired by the character of Mariana Ximenes. With Marisol Ribeiro, she starred in commercials for Johnson & Johnson. She was also the poster girl for Havaianas, along with actor Rodrigo Lombardi, including recording commercials for the brand. With Positivo Informática, she starred in campaigns for several years. She was also the poster girl for cards by Banco Bradesco. At Avon, she made the cover of the magazine along with Giselle Itié and Sheron Menezzes, also starring in commercials. She was also the poster girl for the Always absorbent line. She became the new poster girl Sunsilk in 2011, starring in the commercial Silk Pro-Natural. She was also the star of the summer campaign Arezzo. She recently starred in a campaign with actor Reynaldo Gianecchini for the brand Cavalera. With only 12 years of being active, Mariana has starred in over 200 commercials.

Awards and nominations

References

External links
Mariana Ximenes Portuguese Wikipedia
 
Interview at Terra.com.br

1981 births
Living people
Actresses from São Paulo
Brazilian people of Italian descent
Brazilian stage actresses
Brazilian telenovela actresses
Brazilian film actresses